Death of an Optimist is the debut studio album by Canadian-American musician Grandson. The album was released on December 4, 2020, through Fueled by Ramen.

Background and recording 
Benjamin's EP, A Modern Tragedy, Vol. 3 was released on September 13, 2019. After the release of the third and final EP of the A Modern Tragedy trilogy, Grandson began working on his first studio album.

The album was first announced on September 23, 2020, with the single "Dirty".

Music and composition 
In an interview with NME, Grandson said that Death of an Optimist is a critical outlook of the current state of affairs and of the year 2020 in general saying, "it is both an origin story and an obituary navigating hope, anxiety, and the state of optimism in 2020."

Reception 

Initial reaction to the album has been positive. David McLaughlin of Kerrang! praised grandson's blending of sounds, saying, "Here’s an artist unafraid of flexing his creativity, exploring sounds from whatever genre tickles his fancy." The Rock Matters Podcast said, "It’s very much a millennial coming of age album. It’s a guy in his mid-20s trying to cling to hope that real change for a better future is possible. And credit to Grandson. He definitely sounds like he's in for the fight."

Track listing

Charts

References 

2020 debut albums
Fueled by Ramen albums
Grandson (musician) albums